The 2010 season of the Palau Soccer League was the seventh season of association football competition in Palau. Daewoo Ngatpang won the championship, their second title and first since the inaugural season.

References

Palau Soccer League seasons
Palau
Soccer